Guereñu is a village in Álava, Basque Country, Spain.

Populated places in Álava